Callopistromyia is a genus of picture-winged flies in the family Ulidiidae.

Species
Callopistromyia annulipes (Macquart, 1855)
Callopistromyia strigula (Loew, 1873)

References

Ulidiidae
Brachycera genera
Taxa named by Friedrich Georg Hendel
Diptera of North America